Wanderson Felippe Cardoso dos Santos (born 4 October 1998), known as Felippe Cardoso or simply Felippe, is a Brazilian professional footballer who plays as a forward for Portuguese club Casa Pia.

Club career

Osvaldo Cruz
Born in São Paulo, Felippe Cardoso joined Osvaldo Cruz's youth setup in 2016, and was promoted to the first-team ahead of the 2017 season. He made his senior debut on 8 April of that year, starting and scoring the opener in a 1–1 Campeonato Paulista Segunda Divisão home draw against Presidente Prudente.

On 17 June 2017, Felippe Cardoso scored a brace in a 2–1 away defeat of Grêmio Prudente, and finished the tournament with 12 goals in 15 matches.

Ponte Preta
On 13 September 2017, Felippe Cardoso joined Ponte Preta on loan, and was initially assigned to the under-20 squad. He impressed during the year's Copa RS, scoring three goals in five matches.

Promoted to the main squad by manager Eduardo Baptista, Felippe Cardoso made his debut for Ponte on 17 January 2018, starting and being sent off in a 1–0 away win against Corinthians. He scored his first goal for the club on 3 February, netting the opener in a 1–1 draw at Ituano.

On 17 February 2018, Felippe Cardoso signed a permanent four-year contract with the Macaca, with the club acquiring 60% of his federative rights.

Santos
On 4 September 2018, Felippe Cardoso joined Série A side Santos on loan until the end of the year. He made his debut for the club fourteen days later, replacing Derlis González in a 0–0 home draw against São Paulo.

On 8 October 2018, despite playing only one match since his arrival, Felippe Cardoso signed a permanent five-year contract with Peixe, after the club activated his buyout clause of R$ 3 million. He scored his first goal in the main category of Brazilian football on 24 November 2018, netting his team's second in a 3–2 home win against Atlético Mineiro.

On 5 July 2019, after losing space with new manager Jorge Sampaoli, Felippe Cardoso was loaned to fellow top tier side Ceará, where he had a good spell at the club, scoring 16 goals in 18 games until the end of the year. The following 8 January, he moved to Fluminense on loan for the 2020 campaign.

On 1 April 2021, Felippe Cardoso moved abroad and agreed to a loan deal with Vegalta Sendai until the end of the year. On 29 December, his loan was extended for another season.

On 6 January 2023, Felippe Cardoso reached an agreement with Santos to terminate his contract, due to expire in September.

Career statistics

References

External links

1998 births
Living people
Footballers from São Paulo
Brazilian footballers
Association football forwards
Campeonato Brasileiro Série A players
Campeonato Brasileiro Série B players
Associação Atlética Ponte Preta players
Santos FC players
Ceará Sporting Club players
Fluminense FC players
J1 League players
J2 League players
Vegalta Sendai players
Casa Pia A.C. players
Brazilian expatriate footballers
Brazilian expatriate sportspeople in Japan
Brazilian expatriate sportspeople in Portugal
Expatriate footballers in Japan
Expatriate footballers in Portugal